Attheyella yemanjae is a species of copepod in the family Canthocamptidae. It is listed as conservation dependent on the IUCN Red List. The specific epithet yemanjae commemorates Yemanjá, the "beneficent and terrible goddess of the sea and the patroness of those who work on the waters" in Candombé mythology.

References

Harpacticoida
Fauna of Brazil
Freshwater crustaceans of South America
Arthropods of South America
Taxonomy articles created by Polbot
Crustaceans described in 1993